Trematodon is a genus of moss belonging to the family Bruchiaceae.

The genus was first described by André Michaux.

The genus has cosmopolitan distribution.

Species:
 Trematodon ambiguus Hornschuch, 1819

References

Dicranales
Moss genera